Bendire's thrasher (Toxostoma bendirei) is a medium-sized species of thrasher native to the southwestern United States and northwestern Mexico. Coloration is grayish-brown on its upperparts with paler, faintly dark streaked underparts. The base of the lower bill is often pale, the eyes are bright yellow, and the tips of the tail are white-tipped.

Identification
Because of its similar coloration and structure to the curve-billed thrasher, the two birds are very easy to mistake for one another. The Bendire's thrasher's shorter bill is a distinguishing feature when comparing mature birds, but it is still easy to misidentify an adult Bendire's thrasher as a young curve-billed thrasher as its beak has not grown to a mature length.  The Bendire's thrasher's yellow eyes and pale-based lower mandible are additional markings which aid in separation from the curve-billed thrasher.

Distribution and habitat
Bendire's thrasher lives in the brush-filled deserts and valleys and drylands of the south-western United States, mainly along the southern border that Arizona and New Mexico shares with Mexico, (the Madrean sky islands, mountain range sky islands of the northern Mexican range: Sierra Madre Occidental).

Nesting
The Bendire's thrasher constructs a cup-shaped nest from twigs, lining the interior with grass stems and rootlets. It is usually placed in a cactus or an otherwise thorny desert shrub or tree. The female lays three or four eggs, which are pale green to blue in color, and speckled with brown and purple.

Diet
The Bendire's thrasher, like many other thrashers, feeds on small ground-dwelling insects as well as berries.

Voice
Like other mimids, the often silent Bendire's thrasher incorporates the songs and calls of other species into its own songs.  A   sharp "chek" is the species' most common call.

Discovery

On July 28, 1872 U.S. Army Lieutenant Charles Bendire was hiking through the brushy desert near Fort Lowell, Arizona. While exploring the desert Bendire, an avid bird enthusiast, spotted a bird that was unfamiliar to him. Lieutenant Bendire shot the bird, which appeared to be a female thrasher, and sent its remains to the Smithsonian Institution in Washington, D.C.

The remains of the specimen were examined by Elliott Coues, who was perplexed as to its species. After several of Coues's colleagues looked at the bird they believed it was a female curve-billed thrasher, but Coues did not agree with their conclusion. Coues believed that the thrasher was a species unknown to science and sought out Bendire for additional information on the bird. Bendire replied to Coues with his affirmation that he also believed that it was a new species.

Lieutenant Bendire soon sent back a second specimen of the thrasher, a male, and details about its habits and eggs, all which were different from those of a curve-billed thrasher. Finally convinced, Coues named the new thrasher species Bendire's thrasher in the honor of Charles Bendire.

Conservation
The Bendire's thrasher is listed as Vulnerable due to range-wide declines primarily as a result of the conversion of habitat to farmland.

References

External links
BirdLife - Bendire's Thrasher
Bendire's Thrasher photo gallery CalPhotos
Bendire's Thrasher photo gallery VIREO
Photo-High Res; Article "Migratory Bird Center"-Smithsonian

Bendire's thrasher
Bendire's thrasher
Endemic birds of Southwestern North America
Fauna of the Sonoran Desert
Fauna of the Mojave Desert
Fauna of the Chihuahuan Desert
Fauna of the Lower Colorado River Valley
Birds of the Rio Grande valleys
Birds of Mexico
Native birds of the Southwestern United States
Bendire's thrasher